Avishai (Yaish) Jano is an Israeli international footballer. Jano played usually as an attacking right defender or a right winger. He spent most of his career in Maccabi Haifa (1995–2004), with whom he won all of his honours. Jano retired from football in 2009.

Honours
Israeli Premier League (3):
2000–01, 2001–02, 2003–04
Israel State Cup (1):
1997–98
Toto Cup (1):
2001–02

References

External links
  Profile and biography of Avishai Jano on Maccabi Haifa's official website
  Profile and statistics of Avishai Jano on One.co.il

1970 births
Living people
Israeli Jews
Israeli footballers
Maccabi Haifa F.C. players
Maccabi Netanya F.C. players
Hapoel Nof HaGalil F.C. players
Hapoel Hadera F.C. players
Ironi Tiberias F.C. players
Israel international footballers
Liga Leumit players
Israeli Premier League players
Israeli people of Moroccan-Jewish descent
Footballers from Nof HaGalil
Association football defenders